The Burnham-on-Crouch and District Museum, located in Burnham-on-Crouch, Essex, is a registered charity run by members of the Burnham History Society, aiming to reflect the history and development of the town and the local people.

The museum is now situated on the waterfront at the end of Coronation Road, and occupies a former Tucker Brown boat builders premises originally constructed sometime around 1910. The museum moved to its current location in the late 1990s and with help of a national lottery grant extended the original boat builders adding a large lower gallery which houses the domestic life display with a mezzanine which houses a display on the agricultural history of the Dengie. Prior to moving to the current location the museum had started out in a small room off the high street

The museum has a vast array of displays from the early Mesolithic inhabitants of Burnham-on-Crouch, the town during Roman occupation and the local Red hills ito the town's local history, with displays on domestic life, the local maritime history of the area with a full size boat built in Burnham on crouch, the agricultural history of the Dengie, the industrial history of the town with a displays dedicated to both the foundry and printers, and the areas social history. In 2015, the museum opened a new large display of Eocene fossils, including a comprehensive collection of Eocene shark teeth.

The museum also contains an archive of local history documents, drawings, pictures and a reference library.

The Burnham History Society hosts talks within the gallery of the museum on the third Monday of every month.

The museum recently started an exciting new project restoring a large collection of Romano–British pottery, Iron Age pottery and Bronze Age pottery. The pottery is being restored in the main gallery to allow visitors so see the stages of restoration, and ask any questions they may have.

The pottery was originally excavated by the Passmore Edwards museum immediately prior to the building of the Springfield Industrial Estate, it was given to the Burnham-on-Crouch & District Museum by the Passmore Edwards museum when they closed.

References

External links
 Burnham-on-Crouch and District Museum - official site

Burnham-on-Crouch
Local museums in Essex